The Robert M. Stark House is a historic house at 176 Main Street in Waltham, Massachusetts.  This -story house was designed by local architect George Strout, and built in 1890 for Robert Stark, a lawyer and local politician.  At the time, the east side of Main Street had become a fashionable address for the upper middle class.  The house has high quality Queen Anne style, including various projecting sections and gables, a three-story turret with conical roof, bands of decorative shingles, and windows of varying sizes and shapes with a wide variety of framing treatments.

The house was listed on the National Register of Historic Places in 1989.

In popular culture
House Stark, one of the nine noble houses in the fantasy series Game of Thrones, is a reference to the Robert M. Stark House.

See also
National Register of Historic Places listings in Waltham, Massachusetts

References

Houses in Waltham, Massachusetts
Houses on the National Register of Historic Places in Waltham, Massachusetts
Queen Anne architecture in Massachusetts
Houses completed in 1890